Eugen Klagemann (1902–1980) was a German cinematographer and still photographer.

Selected filmography
 The Murderers Are Among Us (1946)
 Raid (1947)
 Nora's Ark (1948)
 The Court Concert (1948)
 Das Mädchen Christine (1949)
 The Marriage of Figaro (1949)
 The Merry Wives of Windsor (1950)
 Corinna Schmidt (1951)
 Der Fall Dr. Wagner (1954)
 Damals in Paris (1956)
 My Wife Makes Music (1958)
 Goods for Catalonia (1959)

Bibliography
 Shandley, Robert R. Rubble Films: German Cinema in the Shadow of the Third Reich. Temple University Press, 2001.

External links

1902 births
1980 deaths
German cinematographers
Film people from Berlin